Roberta Monaldini is a road cyclist from San Marino. She participated at the 2012 UCI Road World Championships.

References

External links
 profile at Procyclingstats.com

Living people
Place of birth missing (living people)
Year of birth missing (living people)